Badamak may refer to:

Bādamak (بادمك)
Badamak, Fars

Bādāmak (بادامك)
Badamak, Hamadan
Badamak, Kerman
Badamak, Lorestan
Badamak, Qazvin
Badamak, South Khorasan
Badamak, Tehran
Badamak, Yazd